Mosaic451 LLC provides custom-built cyber security management, detection and response services for the high-risk, highly-regulated global enterprise. Their core competency is security OT and IT environments for energy, transportation, manufacturing, government and finance.

The company's headquarters are located in downtown Phoenix, Arizona with regional offices located in Las Vegas, Nevada and Portland, Oregon. The company has been quickly growing since 2011 and featured on the Inc. 5000 list of fastest-growing private companies since 2016.

Mosaic451 has also been the recipient of the Channel Company’s CRN Fast Growth 150, Tech Elite 250 and the Managed Services 500 for the past two years.

History
Michael Baker, former CTO & founder of Torrey Point, along with Cat Baker founded Mosaic451 in 2011 to provide cyber security services to public and private companies. In 2014 it opened its first remote SOC and NOC outside of the Las Vegas area. In 2015 the company completed construction of a new SOC facility in Downtown Phoenix, Arizona.

References

External links
 Official website

Companies based in Phoenix, Arizona